William Simms (7 December 1793 – 21 June 1860) was a British scientific instrument maker.

Early life
He was born in Birmingham, the second of nine children of William Simms (1763-1828), a toy maker. Soon after William Simm's birth the family moved to London so that William Simms Sr. could help his ailing father, James Simms, who had a jewellery business in Whitecross Street. This business was soon converted to the manufacture of optical instruments. William Sr. prospered and in 1804 he was elected a Freeman of the City.

William Simms Jr. was sent in January 1806 to be educated in mathematics by a Mr. Hayward. After two years education in January 1808 he was apprenticed to Thomas Penstone, a member of the Worshipful Company of Goldsmiths. However William's interests lay elsewhere and in 1808 he was apprenticed to his father.

Career
He was elected a Freeman of the Worshipful Company of Goldsmiths in 1815 and set up in business for himself, working until 1818 at his father's Blackfriars premises. His elder brother James was already establishing his own reputation for navigational instruments.

William Simms' chief interest was the division of the circle, the accuracy of which was essential to the manufacture of accurate scientific instruments. He became a correspondent of Thomas Jones, who brought him into contact with the instrument maker Edward Troughton and also persuaded him to join the Royal Society for the encouragement of Arts, Manufactures & Commerce. Here he met the engineer Bryan Donkin, and also Colonel Colby of the Ordnance Survey.

In the 1825 Simms was asked to repair and redivide an astronomical circle made by Troughton in 1800. Simms made and replaced parts where required, then redivided the circle. Later Simms wrote a paper for Troughton proposing a new method for dividing circles that was more accurate than an engine and quicker than using a roller. Edward Troughton took on William Simms as a partner in 1826 
On Troughton's retirement Simms took over his business, which had a very good reputation in the manufacture of scientific instruments.

Simms specialized in surveying instruments and from 1817 supplied theodolites to the Ordnance Survey and then to the East India Company, including those used by George Everest. On a larger scale he supplied telescopes, mural circles and other astronomical instruments to observatories at Kraków, Madras, Cambridge, Lucknow, Calcutta, Edinburgh, Brussels, Greenwich and other places. By the close of his career he had supplied most of the world's leading observatories with equipment.

Simms' work formed the basis of the treatise on mathematical instruments written by his younger brother Frederick Walter Simms, who went on to become an important writer on civil engineering.

His reputation was enhanced by the improvements he made to graduating instruments and his self-acting circular dividing engine reduced the work involved in manufacture from weeks to hours. He also helped standardize the measures of length the yard and chain for the Admiralty.

Simms was elected an Associate of the Institution of Civil Engineers in 1828. He was a Fellow of the Royal Astronomical Society, which he joined in 1831, and elected a Fellow of the Royal Society in 1852.

Simms died at the family home in Carshalton on 21 June 1860 and was buried at West Norwood Cemetery. His family, most especially his son James Simms carried on his instrument making work.

Honours
Simms Rock in Antarctica is named after William Simms.

See also
List of astronomical instrument makers

References

 
 

1793 births
1860 deaths
People associated with astronomy
British scientific instrument makers
Fellows of the Royal Society
Burials at West Norwood Cemetery
Engineers from London